Pichia anomala is a species of ascomycete and teleomorphic fungi of the genus Pichia.  It is used as a preventive (biocontrol agent) for undesirable fungi or mold, nevertheless it may spoil food in large quantities. It is used in wine making, airtight stored grain (preventing Aspergillus flavus aflatoxins), apples, and grapevines. P. anomala has been reclassified as Wickerhamomyces anomalus.

Features
Distinguished from some other species of Pichia by high osmotolerance, P. anomala ferments sucrose, and assimilates raffinose.  Does not exhibit crabtree effect but rather Pasteur effect.

Products
 ethanol under anaerobiosis
 acetate under respiratory and respirofermentative growth. 
 ethyl acetate from glucose under oxygen limitation, also other small volatiles, e.g., ethyl propanoate, phenyl ethanol, and 2-phenylethyl acetate. 
 glycerol, arabinitol, and trehalose under osmotic stress and oxygen limitation.

References

Viticulture
Saccharomycetaceae
Yeasts
Yeasts used in brewing